The Zec de la Rivière-Dartmouth is a "zone d'exploitation contrôlée" (controlled harvesting zone] (zec) in the unorganized territory of the Saint-Jean River, in La Côte-de-Gaspé Regional County Municipality, in the administrative region of Gaspésie-Îles-de-la-Madeleine, in Quebec, in Canada.

Geography 

The Dartmouth River rises in the north-east of the peninsula of Gaspésie. The river flows mainly in forested and uninhabited region; however, approaching its mouth, the river passes through a rural residential area in the city of Gaspé. The Dartmouth River has beautiful mountain scenery. This wild river offers the tranquility and charm of memorable fishing activities.

Recreational fishing 

Recreational wading fishing on the river is most common. To properly controlled aquatic fauna, the Dartmouth River is divided into seven fishing zones:
 3 non-quota areas: 1, 3 and 5 No reservations, unlimited number of poles;
 4 zones quota (2 sticks): 2, 4, 6, and 7 These areas are subject to a preseason draw on November 1. The draw at 48 hours in advance for locations is still available.

Salmon sometimes behave different ways from a pit to another one, depending on the time of the season, the water level, current, or the characteristics of a pit; which involves various fishing strategies (e.g.: choice of fly and position around the pit) for wading.

Toponymy 

The name "Zec de la Rivière-Dartmouth" was formalized on Sept. 5, 1985 at the Bank of place names in the Commission de toponymie du Québec (Geographical Names Board of Quebec).

See also 
 Rivière-Saint-Jean (La Côte-de-Gaspé), unorganized territory
 Gaspésie
 Darmouth River
 Saint-Jean River (Gaspé)
 Gaspé
 Zec de la Rivière-York (controlled harvesting zone) (zec)
 Zone d'exploitation contrôlée (controlled harvesting zone) (zec)

Notes and references

External links 
  of "zec de la Rivière-Darmouth".
  of "Ministère des Ressources naturelles et de la Faune", retrieved on August 9, 2014.
  of "Saumon-Québec" - "Zec de la Rivière-Darmouth".

Protected areas of Gaspésie–Îles-de-la-Madeleine
Gaspé Peninsula
Protected areas established in 1983